The Gambulu, Gambulai, or Gambuli were a tribe of Arameans in ancient Babylonia. They were the most powerful tribe along the eastern border of Babylonia, or in the south toward the border with Elam. It is difficult to pinpoint their exact location. H. W. F. Saggs places them "south of the Diyala river toward the Elamite border."

When Assyrian king Sargon II (722-705) waged war against them in the city of Dur-Athara, 18,430 were deported.

The Gambulu, along with the Puqudu, continued to be politically important as far as the sixth century.

References

Arameans
Aramean tribes
Aramean states
Ancient peoples of the Near East